The Rough, Tough West is a 1952 American Western film directed by Ray Nazarro and starring Charles Starrett, Jock Mahoney and Carolina Cotton. It was released in 1952, during the last year of the Durango Kid series of films. At this late date the series relied on cost-cutting measures to stay within a low budget, so this film contains footage from older Starrett westerns.

Plot 
The Durango Kid arrives in a mining town in search of an old friend, only to find the man is now running the town and has become corrupt, which brings him to disguise himself as a masked stranger while exposing his old pal as the felon he is… (by DJK - 2023)

Partial cast
 Charles Starrett as Steve Holden / The Durango Kid  
 Jock Mahoney as Big Jack Mahoney 
 Carolina Cotton as Carolina 
 Pee Wee King as Pee Wee - Golden West Cowboys Band Leader  
 Pee Wee King and His Band as Musicians  
 Raider as Durango's Horse  
 Bullet as Steve's Horse  
 Smiley Burnette as Fire Chief Smiley Burnette

References

Bibliography
 Gene Freese. Jock Mahoney: The Life and Films of a Hollywood Stuntman. McFarland, 2013.

External links
 

1952 films
1952 Western (genre) films
1950s English-language films
American Western (genre) films
Films directed by Ray Nazarro
Columbia Pictures films
American black-and-white films
1950s American films